Harry Gardner may refer to:
 Harry Gardner (baseball) (1887–1961), American baseball player
 Harry Gardner (cricketer) (1890–1939), English cricketer and British Army officer
 Harry Gardner (footballer) (1878–1957), Australian rules footballer

See also
 Henry Gardner (1819–1892), governor of Massachusetts
 Henry B. Gardner (1863–1939), American economist